Tukimihia Simpkins (born 24 December 2001) is a professional rugby league footballer who plays as a  forward for the Wests Tigers in the NRL.

Background 
Simpkins was born in Rotorua, New Zealand, and is of Māori  descent.

Career

Early career 
Simpkins begun his career playing rugby union for Rotorua Boys High School first XV. He signed with Super Rugby franchise the Chiefs when he was 15 and held brief talks with the Crusaders. He was first spotted by North Queensland Cowboys scouts at the New Zealand 15s rugby league tournament in Rotorua in 2016.

He became a New Zealand Secondary Schools rugby league representative and played for the New Zealand Residents team in 2019 before heading to Australia in 2020.

In 2020, he was signed by the North Queensland Cowboys, he played one game with North Queensland feeder club the Townsville Blackhawks in the under 20s competition. He was brought to the Wests Tigers on a three-year-deal in a player swap deal with Kane Bradley.

2021 
Simpkins began the 2021 season playing for Western Suburbs in the New South Wales Cup.

Simpkins made his debut from the bench in round 18 of the 2021 NRL season for Wests Tigers in their 42–24 victory over the Brisbane Broncos at Lang Park.

Controversy
On 24 January 2022, it was revealed that Simpkins had allegedly been involved in a car accident in which he mounted the kerb and drove through a fence while also being unlicensed.  Simpkins then allegedly fled the scene of the accident but later handed himself into NSW Police.  The Wests Tigers club later released a statement saying "Wests Tigers have been made aware of an incident involving NRL player Tukimihia Simpkins, the club has alerted the NRL to the matter and will continue to work with the NRL Integrity Unit as needed".

References

External links 
 Tigers profile

2001 births
Living people
New Zealand sportspeople of Samoan descent
New Zealand rugby league players
Rugby league players from Rotorua
Rugby league second-rows
Wests Tigers players
Western Suburbs Magpies NSW Cup players